Hosahudya is a village located in Bagepalli of Chikkaballapura district, Karnataka, India. There are 1625 people, 813 male and 812 female, living in 419 households.

Hosahudya village is administrated by a sarpanch, in accordance with the Panchyati Raaj Act and the Constitution of India.

Population
The 2011 census information is:

References

Cities and towns in Chikkaballapur district